Until the Grinders Cease is the debut album of Sky Cries Mary, released in 1989 through Lively Art.

Track listing

Personnel 
Jon Auer – bass guitar, percussion, vocals
Roderick Wolgamott Romero – vocals, percussion
Ken Stringfellow – guitar, drums, vocals, engineering, mixing

References

External links 
 

1989 debut albums
Sky Cries Mary albums